The Twenty-Third Wisconsin Legislature convened from  to  in regular session.

Senators representing even-numbered districts were newly elected for this session and were serving the first year of a two-year term. Assembly members were elected to a one-year term. Assembly members and even-numbered senators were elected in the general election of November 2, 1869. Senators representing odd-numbered districts were serving the second year of their two-year term, having been elected in the general election held on November 3, 1868.

Major events
 February 3, 1870: Fifteenth Amendment to the United States Constitution was ratified by the required three-fourths of U.S. states.
 June 22, 1870: The U.S. Congress created the United States Department of Justice.
 July 19, 1870: France declared war on the Kingdom of Prussia, initiating the Franco-Prussian War.
 September 4, 1870: French Emperor Napoleon III was deposed and the French Third Republic was established.
 October 12, 1870: Former Confederate general Robert E. Lee died after suffering a stroke.

Major legislation

Party summary

Senate summary

Assembly summary

Sessions
 1st Regular session: January 12, 1870March 17, 1870

Leaders

Senate leadership
 President of the Senate: Thaddeus C. Pound (R)
 President pro tempore: David Taylor (R)

Assembly leadership
 Speaker of the Assembly: James M. Bingham (R)

Members

Members of the Senate
Members of the Wisconsin Senate for the Twenty-Third Wisconsin Legislature:

Members of the Assembly
Members of the Assembly for the Twenty-Third Wisconsin Legislature:

Employees

Senate employees
 Chief Clerk: Leander B. Hills
 Assistant Clerk: H. H. Rust
 Bookkeeper: Robert A. Gillett
 Engrossing Clerk: A. J. High
 Enrolling Clerk: J. H. Balch
 Transcribing Clerk: Julia A. Hubbard
 Sergeant-at-Arms: Earl M. Rogers
 Assistant Sergeant-at-Arms: William Freeman
 Postmaster: L. D. Frost
 Assistant Postmaster: T. Watson
 Doorkeeper: D. W. Collins
 Doorkeeper: W. Cook
 Assistant Doorkeeper: Levi Burgett
 Assistant Doorkeeper: F. Chamberlain
 Gallery Doorkeeper: H. A. Wilcox
 Night Watch: John Grant Jr.
 President's Attendant: F. Bowers
 Porter: A. T. Conger
 Messengers:
 Eddie Knight
 Willie Hadley
 Charlie Young
 Charles F. Torgerson
 Charlie S. Vedder
 Max Roeder

Assembly employees
 Chief Clerk: Ephraim W. Young
 Assistant Clerk: William M. Newcomb
 Bookkeeper: Fred A. Dennett
 Engrossing Clerk: A. H. Reed
 Enrolling Clerk: S. F. Hammond
 Transcribing Clerk: G. H. Brock
 Sergeant-at-Arms: O. C. Johnson
 1st Assistant Sergeant-at-Arms: O. C. Bissell
 2nd Assistant Sergeant-at-Arms: S. C. McDonald
 Postmaster: J. H. Wagoner
 1st Assistant Postmaster: Myron DeWolf
 2nd Assistant Postmaster: Henry Stannard
 Doorkeepers: 
 W. S. Seavey
 A. B. Finch
 Joseph F. Wigmore
 W. W. Dantz
 Night Watch: John K. Parish
 Firemen:
 Sidney Emmes
 E. G. Garner
 Gallery Attendants: 
 George A. Phinney
 H. S. Grinde
 Committee Room Attendants:
 T. D. Powers
 Fred Keud
 Hiram Steffins
 George Slurzsby
 Porter: J. W. Plato
 Speaker's Messenger: C. Bingham
 Chief Clerk's Messenger: Frank R. Norton
 Messengers:
 Emile Hammer
 Frank Beyler
 Daniel Fitzpatrick
 Frank Johnson
 Henry A. Douglas
 Charles S. Parker
 Marshall Jackson
 Oscar Green
 Clarence Patch
 Willie Holmes
 Thaddeus W. Sutliff

References

External links
 1870: Related Documents from Wisconsin Legislature

1870 in Wisconsin
Wisconsin
Wisconsin legislative sessions